Daguan is a station on Line 7 of the Chengdu Metro in China. It was opened on 6 December 2017.

Station layout

Gallery

References

Railway stations in Sichuan
Railway stations in China opened in 2017
Chengdu Metro stations